The Turf Classic Stakes is a Grade I American thoroughbred horse race for open to horses aged four and older, over a distance of one and one-eighth miles, on the turf held annually in early May on the Kentucky Derby day meeting at Churchill Downs in Louisville, Kentucky during the spring meeting.

History
This race was inaugurated on 1 May 1987 as the Early Times Turf Classic Stakes and was the first stakes race run on the new Matt Winn Turf Course. The event was won by the reigning US Champion Male Turf Horse Manila, his eighth straight victory by three lengths as the short 2-5 odds-on favorite in a small field of four starters.

The event was classified as Grade III in 1989 for its third running, upgraded to Grade II in 1994 and since 1996 a Grade I.

The event has had three sponsor name changes which have contributed to the high purse and growth is status of the event. The sponsorship has been by the Brown-Forman Corporation, one of the largest North American-owned companies in the spirits and wine business which is based in Louisville. The sponsorship has been reflected in the name of the event since the first running. Early Times, from 1987 to 1999, Woodford Reserve, from 2000 to 2017 and since 2018 Old Forester.

The event has attracted the finest turf horses. The 1993 winner Lure set the speed record for the event with fast time of 1:46.34.
Lure continued on to win the Breeders' Cup Mile for the second time later that year. The following year, in 1994 the winner Paradise Creek won the Arlington Million en route to being voted the U. S. Champion Male Turf Horse. In recent years the winners include two-time US Horse of the Year Wise Dan dual winner in 2013 and 2014 and Bricks and Mortar who would be crowned U. S. Horse of the Year in 2019.

Records
Speed record
 1:46.34 – Lure (1993)

Margins 
 lengths – Wise Dan (2013)

Most wins
 2 – Einstein (BRZ)  (2008, 2009)
 2 – Wise Dan (2013, 2014)
 2 –  Divisidero    (2016, 2017)

Most wins by an owner
 3 – Klaravich Stables (2019, 2020, 2021)

Most wins by a jockey
 3 – Pat Day (1988, 1994, 1996)
 3 – Robby Albarado (1998, 2005, 2008)

Most wins by a Trainer
 3 – Chad Brown (2019, 2020, 2021)
 3 – William I. Mott (1994, 2004, 2018)

Winners

Legend:

 

Notes:

§ Ran as an entry

See also

 List of graded stakes at Churchill Downs
 List of American and Canadian Graded races
 Woodford Reserve Turf Classic Stakes "top three finishers" and starters

References

Grade 1 turf stakes races in the United States
Open mile category horse races
Churchill Downs horse races
Recurring sporting events established in 1987
1987 establishments in Kentucky
Graded stakes races in the United States